Platygryllus primiformis is a small (approx. ) brown cricket and is a member of the true cricket family Gryllidae.

Location
This cricket is found in Eastern and Southern Africa.

Uses
This cricket has been used as a study species in behavioural ecology, specifically mate choice.

References

Crickets
Orthoptera of Africa
Insects described in 1984